Diklići is a place name found in former Yugoslavia. It may refer to:

Diklići, Trebinje, Bosnia and Herzegovina
Diklići, Ravno, Bosnia and Herzegovina
, Croatia

See also
Diklić, surname

Serbo-Croatian place names